HMS Spy was launched at 1800 at Topsham in 1800 as the mercantile vessel Comet. The Royal Navy purchased her in 1804 and renamed her HMS  Spy. From 1810 she served as store ship. In 1812 she repelled an attack by a French privateer in a single-ship action. The French captured her in 1812 and then released her. The Navy sold her in 1813. Her new owners returned her to mercantile service under the name Comet. She was last listed in 1829.

Merchantman
Comet entered Lloyd's Register in 1800 with E. Tate, master, Lyall, owner, and trade London–Trinidad. It gave her burthen as 258 tons. This information continued unchanged until the Royal Navy purchased Comet.

Royal Navy service
The Navy purchased Comet in June 1804 and had Barnard in Deptford fit her in May–June. Between 12 June and 9 August she was at Deptford Dockyard undergoing further fitting. Also in June, Commander John Bushby commissioned her for the North Sea. Later that year Commander John Hudson replace Bushby.

In July 1807 Spy was in ordinary at Sheerness. Between September and October 1810 Spy was at Woolwich undergoing fitting as a store ship. She then was under the command of Richard Anderson, master.

On 10 December 1812 Spy repelled an attack by a French privateer schooner of 10 guns and 120 men in an action that lasted 50 minutes.

Lloyd's List reported on 5 January 1813 that the store ship Spy had come into Cork. The  had captured Spy on the 20th and released her the same day. Gloire had disarmed Spy and then sent her into England as a cartel. Spy arrived at Plymouth on 16 January.

The Royal Navy sold Spy at Deptford in December 1813.

Comet again
Comet, of 275 tons (bm), British built, reappeared in Lloyd's Register in 1814 with Wilcocson, master, Parker & Co., owner, and trade London–Quebec. The 1815 volume changed her origin to N. Shoreham, and her burthen to 254 tons. She made voyages to Bermuda and Montreal as well.

Fate
Comet was last listed in 1829.

Citations

References
 .
 

1800 ships
Age of Sail merchant ships of England
Sloops of the Royal Navy
Captured ships